Gerald McCann (born March 20, 1950) is an American Democratic Party politician who served two non-consecutive terms as mayor of Jersey City, New Jersey before being convicted of fraud in a savings-and-loan scam. When he was elected in 1981 he was the second-youngest mayor in the city's history.

Biography
Born in the Greenville section of Jersey City on March 20, 1950, he served as mayor from 1981 to 1985 and again from 1989 to 1992. In 1992, "He was indicted for mail fraud, bank fraud, tax evasion, making false statements to the IRS, and failure to file his taxes."   The prosecutor was then–United States Attorney Michael Chertoff. McCann said of the lead prosecutor, "It will become obvious that they were insane to bring this case in the first place. And we are going to send Mr. Chertoff back to preparing wills. Maybe I can find him a job driving a sanitation truck in Jersey City." McCann was convicted on 15 of 16 counts. He spent two years in federal prison.

As a convicted felon, McCann was barred from running for political office again.

In February, 2010, McCann was hired as an inspector for the city's incinerator authority.

References

1950 births
Living people
American politicians convicted of federal public corruption crimes
School board members in New Jersey
Mayors of Jersey City, New Jersey
New Jersey politicians convicted of corruption
New Jersey politicians convicted of crimes